This is a list of monuments in Ramechhap District, Nepal as officially recognized by and available through the website of the Department of Archaeology, Nepal. Ramechhap is a district of Bagmati Province and is located in central Nepal. Hindu temples are the main attraction of this district. There are several few mountains in this district. The highest mountain in this district is Numbur Mountain.

List of monuments

|}

See also 
 List of monuments in Bagmati Province
 List of monuments in Nepal

References 

Ramechhap